Raymond Caruana (9 May 1960 – 5 December 1986) was a Maltese political activist affiliated with the Nationalist Party (PN). Caruana was murdered in a drive-by shooting at a PN club in Gudja.

Murder

While Caruana was at the PN club in Gudja, Malta, a car drove past the club firing several shots. One bullet hit him in the throat, killing him. 

Peter Paul Busuttil was accused of the murder; however, in the Maltese Law Courts, it later transpired that Busuttil had been the victim of a frame-up by the Labour Party with the aid of the police. The case is still unsolved to the present days.

During the December 1986 TV transmission of the budget debates in Parliament, Wistin Abela assaulted Eddie Fenech Adami when the latter brought up the shooting of Raymond Caruana.

See also
List of unsolved murders

References

Further reading
 Editor "Raymond Caruana family angry at being exploited at Caruana Galizia 'shrine'" Article in "The Times of Malta", 16 February 2018
 Matthew Vella "Pietru Pawl Busuttil, victim of 1986 police frame-up, passes away" Article in "The Malta Today", 28 June 2017
 Daphne Caruana Galizia, "Shot dead at 26 by Mintoff’s thugs" Article in "Running Commentary", 24 August 2012
 Bertrand Borg "Will Raymond Caruana killer remain free?" Article in "The Times of Malta", 4 December 2011
 Lou Bondi "Raymond Caruana's murder and Julia's family?" Article in "BondiBlog", 28 October 2011

1986 deaths
1960 births
Deaths by firearm in Malta
Male murder victims
Maltese activists
Maltese murder victims
People murdered in Malta
Unsolved murders in Malta